This is a list of military actions in the American Revolutionary War. Actions marked with an asterisk involved no casualties.

Major campaigns, theaters, and expeditions of the war
 Boston campaign (1775–1776)
 Invasion of Quebec (1775–1776)
 New York and New Jersey campaigns (1776–1777)
 Saratoga campaign (1777)
 Philadelphia campaign (1777–1778)
 Yorktown campaign (1781)
 Northern theater of the American Revolutionary War after Saratoga (1778–1781)
 Southern theater of the American Revolutionary War (1775–1783)
 Western theater of the American Revolutionary War (1777–1782)
 Naval operations in the American Revolutionary War

Battles (in chronological order)

See also

 List of Continental Forces in the American Revolutionary War
 List of British Forces in the American Revolutionary War
 List of George Washington articles

American Revolutionary War
Battles